Careproctus is a genus of snailfishes found in benthic and benthopelagic habitats in the Atlantic, Pacific, Arctic and Southern Oceans. Whether they truly are absent from the Indian Ocean (except for a couple of species in Subantarctic waters) is unknown and might be an artifact of limited sampling. In the Northern Hemisphere they mostly live shallower than Paraliparis, but this pattern is reversed in the Southern Hemisphere. Although almost entirely restricted to very cold waters, a single species, C. hyaleius, lives at hydrothermal vents.

Its generic name is derived from the Ancient Greek κάρα (kara, "face, head") and πρωκτός (prōktos, "anus"), therefore literally meaning "butt-face".

Careproctus have one pair of nostrils and a ventral suction disc but lack a pseudobranch. Like other snailfish, they lack scales and have a loose gelatinous skin; a few species are covered in prickly spines.

Most species of Careproctus are poorly known, but they feed on small animals and some have unusual breeding behaviors: At least C. ovigerus appears to be a mouth brooder where the eggs are carried and develop in the males' mouth. C. fulvus has a commensal relationship with glass sponges, laying their eggs in the paragastric cavity. Several other Careproctus species are parasitic on king crabs (at least Lithodes, Neolithodes and Paralithodes, and likely Lopholithodes), laying their egg mass in the gill chamber of the crab, forming a well-protected and well-aerated mobile "home" until they hatch. As far as known, these parasitic Careproctus are not host specific, but will use various king crab species, and on occasion an individual king crab may even carry the eggs of more than one Careproctus species at the same time. In contrast,  a C. reinhardti (species complex) in an aquarium deposited its eggs on the glass, but whether this resembles its wild behavior is unknown.

Species
There are currently about 125 recognized species in this genus, but new species are regularly described and it is likely to actually contain more than 140. It formerly also included the species now separated in the genus Volodichthys.

 Careproctus abbreviatus Burke, 1930
 Careproctus acaecus Andriashev, 1991 (appendage-less snailfish)
 Careproctus acanthodes C. H. Gilbert & Burke, 1912 (toge snailfish)
 Careproctus aciculipunctatus Andriashev & Chernova, 1997 (finely-speckled snailfish)
 Careproctus acifer Andriashev & Stein, 1998
 Careproctus aculeolatus Andriashev, 1991 (small-spine snailfish)
 Careproctus albescens Barnard, 1927
Careproctus ambustus 
 Careproctus ampliceps Andriashev & Stein, 1998
 Careproctus armatus Andriashev, 1991
 Careproctus atakamensis Andriashev, 1998
 Careproctus atrans Andriashev, 1991 (black snailfish)
 Careproctus attenuatus C. H. Gilbert & Burke, 1912
 Careproctus aureomarginatus Andriashev, 1991 (marginate snailfish)
 Careproctus bathycoetus C. H. Gilbert & Burke, 1912
 Careproctus batialis Popov, 1933
 Careproctus bowersianus C. H. Gilbert & Burke, 1912
 Careproctus cactiformis Andriashev, 1990
 Careproctus canus Kido, 1985
 Careproctus carinatus Chernova, 2014 (keel-belly snailfish)
 Careproctus colletti C. H. Gilbert, 1896 (Alaska snailfish)
 Careproctus comus J. W. Orr & Maslenikov, 2007 (comic snailfish)
 Careproctus continentalis Andriashev & Prirodina, 1990
 Careproctus credispinulosus Andriashev & Prirodina, 1990
 Careproctus crozetensis Duhamel & N. J. King, 2007
 Careproctus curilanus C. H. Gilbert & Burke, 1912
 Careproctus cyclocephalus Kido, 1983
 Careproctus cypseluroides P. Y. Schmidt, 1950
 Careproctus cypselurus (D. S. Jordan & C. H. Gilbert, 1898)
 Careproctus derjugini Chernova, 2005 (Derjugin's snailfish)
 Careproctus discoveryae Duhamel & N. J. King, 2007
 Careproctus dubius Zugmayer, 1911 (doubtful snailfish)
 Careproctus ectenes C. H. Gilbert, 1896
 Careproctus eltaninae Andriashev & Stein, 1998
 Careproctus falklandica (Lönnberg, 1905)
 Careproctus faunus J. W. Orr & Maslenikov, 2007 (mischievous snailfish)
 Careproctus fedorovi Andriashev & Stein, 1998
 Careproctus filamentosus Stein, 1978
 Careproctus fulvus Chernova, 2014 (fulvous snailfish)
 Careproctus furcellus C. H. Gilbert & Burke, 1912, 1912
 Careproctus georgianus Lönnberg, 1905
 Careproctus gilberti Burke, 1912 (small-disk snailfish)
 Careproctus griseldea Lloris, 1982
 Careproctus guillemi Matallanas, 1998
 Careproctus homopterus C. H. Gilbert & Burke, 1912
 Careproctus hyaleius Geistdoerfer, 1994
 Careproctus improvisus Andriashev & Stein, 1998
 Careproctus inflexidens Andriashev & Stein, 1998
 Careproctus kamikawai J. W. Orr, 2012 (arbiter snailfish)
 Careproctus karaensis Chernova, 2014 (Kara snailfish)
 Careproctus kidoi Knudsen & Møller, 2008 (Kido's snailfish)
 Careproctus knipowitschi Chernova, 2005 (Knipowitsch's snailfish)
 Careproctus lacmi Andriashev & Stein, 1998
 Careproctus latiosus Andriashev & Chernova, 2011 (broad-mouth snailfish)
 Careproctus leptorhinus Andriashev & Stein, 1998
 Careproctus lerikimae J. W. Orr, Y. Kai & Nakabo, 2015 (dusty snailfish)
 Careproctus longifilis Garman, 1892
 Careproctus longipectoralis Duhamel, 1992
 Careproctus longipinnis Burke, 1912 (long-feather snailfish)
 Careproctus lycopersicus J. W. Orr, 2012
 Careproctus macranchus Andriashev, 1991
 Careproctus macrodiscus P. Y. Schmidt, 1950
 Careproctus macrophthalmus Chernova, 2005 (big-eye snailfish)
 Careproctus maculosus Stein, 2006
 Careproctus magellanicus Matallanas & Pequeño, 2000
 Careproctus marginatus Kido, 1988
 Careproctus mederi P. Y. Schmidt, 1916
 Careproctus melanuroides P. Y. Schmidt, 1950
 Careproctus melanurus C. H. Gilbert, 1892 (black-tail snailfish)
 Careproctus merretti Andriashev & Chernova, 1988 (Merret's snailfish)
 Careproctus mica Chernova, 2014 (babbie snailfish)
 Careproctus micropus (Günther, 1887) (small-eye snailfish)
 Careproctus microstomus Stein, 1978
 Careproctus minimus Andriashev & Stein, 1998
 Careproctus mollis C. H. Gilbert & Burke, 1912
 Careproctus moskalevi Andriashev]] & Chernova, 2012 (Moskalev's snailfish) 
 Careproctus narilobus Stein, 2012
 Careproctus nigricans P. Y. Schmidt, 1950
 Careproctus notosaikaiensis Y. Kai, Ikeguchi & Nakabo, 2011
 Careproctus novaezelandiae Andriashev, 1990
 Careproctus opisthotremus C. H. Gilbert & Burke, 1912
 Careproctus oregonensis Stein, 1978 (small-fin snailfish)
 Careproctus ostentum C. H. Gilbert, 1896
 Careproctus ovigerus (C. H. Gilbert, 1896) (abyssal snailfish)
 Careproctus pallidus (Vaillant, 1888)
 Careproctus parvidiscus Imamura & Nobetsu, 2002
 Careproctus parviporatus Andriashev & Stein, 1998
 Careproctus patagonicus Matallanas & Pequeño, 2000
 Careproctus paxtoni Stein, Chernova & Andriashev, 2001 (blunt-tooth snailfish)
 Careproctus pellucicauda Stein, 2012
 Careproctus pellucidus C. H. Gilbert & Burke, 1912 (pellucid snailfish) 
 Careproctus phasma C. H. Gilbert, 1896 (spectral snailfish) 
 Careproctus polarsterni Duhamel, 1992
 Careproctus profundicola Duhamel, 1992
 Careproctus pseudoprofundicola Andriashev & Stein, 1998
 Careproctus pycnosoma C. H. Gilbert & Burke, 1912
 Careproctus ranula (Goode & T. H. Bean, 1879) (froggy snailfish)
 Careproctus rastrinoides P. Y. Schmidt, 1950
 Careproctus rastrinus C. H. Gilbert & Burke, 1912 (salmon snailfish) 
 Careproctus rausuensis Machi, Nobetsu & Yabe, 2012
 Careproctus reinhardti (Krøyer, 1862) (sea tadpole)
 Careproctus rhodomelas C. H. Gilbert & Burke, 1912
 Careproctus rimiventris Andriashev & Stein, 1998
 Careproctus rosa Chernova, 2014 (rose snailfish)
 Careproctus roseofuscus C. H. Gilbert & Burke, 1912 (round snailfish)
 Careproctus rotundifrons H. Sakurai & Shinohara, 2008
 Careproctus sandwichensis Andriashev & Stein, 1998
 Careproctus scaphopterus Andriashev & Stein, 1998
 Careproctus scottae W. M. Chapman & DeLacy, 1934 (peach-skin snailfish) 
 Careproctus segaliensis C. H. Gilbert & Burke, 1912
 Careproctus seraphimae P. Y. Schmidt, 1950
Careproctus shigemii 
 Careproctus simus [C. H. Gilbert, 1896
 Careproctus sinensis C. H. Gilbert & Burke, 1912
 Careproctus solidus Chernova, 1999 (firm-body snailfish)
 Careproctus spectrum T. H. Bean, 1890 (stippled snailfish) 
 Careproctus steini Andriashev & Prirodina, 1990
 Careproctus stigmatogenus Stein, 2006
 Careproctus tapirus Chernova, 2005 (tapir snailfish)
 Careproctus telescopus Chernova, 2005 (telescope snailfish)
 Careproctus trachysoma C. H. Gilbert & Burke, 1912 (rough snailfish) 
 Careproctus tricapitidens Andriashev & Stein, 1998
 Careproctus uter Chernova, 2014 (drop-shaped snailfish)
 Careproctus vladibeckeri Andriashev & Stein, 1998
 Careproctus zachirus Kido, 1985
 Careproctus zispi Andriashev & Stein, 1998

References

Liparidae
Marine fish genera
Taxa named by Henrik Nikolai Krøyer